Operation Myrmidon was the planned raid during the Second World War by No. 1 Commando and No. 6 Commando in April 1942. This operation was an abortive raid on the Adour Estuary in south-western France. The plan was to disrupt road and rail transport between France and Spain by landing approximately 3,000 troops, consisting of two commandos, No. 1 and No. 6, who would be followed up by one and a half Royal Marine battalions along with an armoured regiment and a motor battalion. On 5 April the ships approached the mouth of the estuary in order to carry out the landing. However, amid bad weather, they encountered a sandbar that they had not expected and were unable to pass it; the raid was called off and the ships returned to the United Kingdom.

References

Conflicts in 1942
World War II British Commando raids
1942 in France